Rahmatullah Nabil (born 30 June 1968) is an Afghan politician. He served as Head of the National Directorate of Security from 2010 to 2012. On September 1, 2013, he was reappointed as acting Director due to the health problems suffered by Asadullah Khalid following an attempted assassination. Nabil was officially reappointed as the full-time Director of the NDS on 28 January 2015. 

Nabil has been blamed for failing to stop the spread of Taliban violence in 2015.

Biography
Mr. Rahmatullah Nabil was born in Jaghato district of Maidan Wardak province of Afghanistan. He is a civil engineer and speaks fluent Dari, Pashto and English.

Mr. Nabil has served in several high-profile government functions since 2002. He joined Afghan government as Deputy National Security Advisor. He then laid the foundation of the President Protection Service (PPS) and has served as the head of (PPS). He managed to promote this service as one of the best security services of Afghan government which is unique in the region. 

In 2010, he was appointed as Director General of the National Directorate of Security (NDS), country’s principal intelligence agency and has served in the agency for two years. During his tenure in NDS his vision was to bring reforms in order to increase the effectiveness and operational capability of NDS. 

After two years, he was appointed as Deputy National Security Advisor and then he rejoined the NDS as acting General Director in September 2013. Before 2002, he served in several branches of UNHCR and he was mainly working on aid supplying to the Afghan refugees. Nabil has no political affiliation and has served as high rank military officer with complete political neutrality and has only Afghan citizenship. 

He resigned in December 2015 as NDS director.

Nabil was a candidate in the 2019 Afghan Presidential elections. He finished in 4th position with 1.86% of the total votes. Nabil publicly boycotted the elections and rejected the final result. 

He successfully fled Afghanistan for an undisclosed location following the 2021 Taliban offensive.

On 16 January 2023, Nabil established a new party in exile called the Afghanistan National Liberty Party (ANLP).

Awards
Nabil has two decorations and medals, Ghazi Ayoub Khan’s medal a high military decoration and Ghazi Wazir Mohammad Akbar Khan’s medal. He has received an appreciation letter from the Afghan Civil Society Association, for his effective efforts in the implementation and oversight of human rights in all NDS detention center.

References

Living people
Afghan politicians
1968 births
People from Maidan Wardak Province
Government ministers of Afghanistan